Count Anatoly (called Anatole) Pavlovich Demidov, 4th Prince of San Donato (San Donato, 31 November OS: 12 November 1874 – Marseille, 27 October 1943) of the Demidov industrial family, was the last Prince and member of his house. He succeeded his elder half-brother Elim Pavlovich Demidov, 3rd Prince of San Donato in 1943 but died in exile in the same year without male issue.

Life
Anatoly Demidov was the son of Princess Elena Petrovna Trubetskaya and Pavel Pavlovich Demidov, 2nd Prince of San Donato. His paternal grandmother was Finnish philanthropist Aurora Karamzin. His father died when young Anatoly was just 11 years old.

In Saint Petersburg on 1 February 1894 he married Evgenia Klimentievna  Podmener (Saint Petersburg, 12 December 1871 - Nice, 13 October 1958), by whom he had three daughters: 
 Princess and Countess Elena Anatolyevna Demidova (Saint Petersburg, 28 August OS: 15 August 1901 - Montreal, 26 June 1970), married in Nice on 29 July 1926 Paul René Geoffroy (Nyons, 2 May 1903 - Montreal, 27 October 1991)
 Princess and Countess Evgenia Anatolyevna Demidova (Saint Petersburg, 25 September OS: 12 September 1902 - Cazouls-lès-Béziers, 25 April 1955), married in Nice on 29 September 1927 Jean Gerber (Sevastopol, 2 February 1905 - Geneva, 9 September 1981)
 Princess and Countess Aurora Anatolyevna Demidova (Wiesbaden, 11 December 1909 - Marseille, 17 March 1944), married in Marseille on 29 July 1933 Jean Giraud (Marseille, 26 October 1912 - Nice, 5 February 1962)

1874 births
1943 deaths
Anatoly
Princes of San Donato
Princes from the Russian Empire

Expatriates from the Russian Empire in Italy
Emigrants from the Russian Empire to France